End Of The Wicked is a controversial 1999 Nigerian horror film directed by Teco Benson and written by Helen Ukpabio. The film was blamed for a rise in witchcraft accusations against children in the 1990s and early 2000s.

Cast
Charles Okafor				
Hilda Dokubo				
Alex Usifo Omiagbo			
Patience Oseni				
Larry Okon				
Mary Ushie				
Helen Ukpabio	
Elizabeth Akpabio
Iniobong Ukpabio	
Kanu Unoaba	
Abasiofon
Ramsey Nouah
Mfonido Ukpabio

Reception

The movie was very controversial in Nigeria and abroad and was heavily criticized for "blurring the line between fact and fiction."

References

1990s supernatural films
Nigerian fantasy films
1990s supernatural horror films
Dark fantasy films
English-language Nigerian films
Horror drama films
Supernatural fantasy films
Films about witchcraft
1990s English-language films